Miranda Richardson is an English actress.

Film

Television

Theatre roles

References

External links 
 

Actress filmographies
British filmographies